Below are the winners for the 2014 African-American film Critics Associations.

Winners
Best Picture:
 Selma (Winner)
 The Imitation Game
 Theory of Everything
 Birdman or (The Unexpected Virtue of Ignorance)
 Belle
 Top Five
 Unbroken
 Dear White People
 Get On Up
 Black or White

Special categories
Special Achievement: Donna Langley, Stephanie Allain, Franklin Leonard
Ashley Boone Award: Debra Martin Chase
Roger Ebert Award: Justin Chang

See also
2014 in film

References

African-American Film Critics Association Awards
2014 film awards